Lenado, Colorado, elevation , is a ghost town in Pitkin County, Colorado near Woody Creek along Woody Creek Road. Its main period of activity was in the late 19th century, due to the local lead and zinc deposits, during which time it was home to ca. 300 people. Following a slump in lead prices, the town became abandoned soon later, notwithstanding a brief surge in activity after 1917 due to a zinc shortage brought on by the First World War.

In the mid-1960s and early 1970s Lenado was resurrected into a logging community and lumber mill which was home to about 100 people working and living there for 15 years.

See also

Colorado
Outline of Colorado
Index of Colorado-related articles
Bibliography of Colorado
Geography of Colorado
History of Colorado
Colorado statistical areas
Glenwood Springs, CO Micropolitan Statistical Area
List of counties in Colorado
Pitkin County, Colorado
List of places in Colorado
List of census-designated places in Colorado
List of forts in Colorado
List of ghost towns in Colorado
List of mountain passes in Colorado
List of mountain peaks of Colorado
List of municipalities in Colorado
List of post offices in Colorado
Protected areas of Colorado

References

External links

Ghost towns in Colorado
Former populated places in Pitkin County, Colorado